DO-214 is a standard that specifies a group of semiconductor packages for surface-mounted diodes.

Overview
The standard includes multiple package variants:  
 DO-214AA, also known as SMB, is the middle size.
 DO-214AB, also known as SMC, is the largest size.
 DO-214AC, also known as SMA, is the smallest size.
 DO-214BA, also known as GF1

References

Semiconductor packages